Adhyapak Jyotish Chandra Ghosh Balika Vidyalaya is a girls' school at Chinsurah in the Hooghly district of West Bengal, India. It is affiliated to the WBBSE (West Bengal Board of Secondary Education) and imparts education up to the 10th Standard. It was established in the year 1987.

References

Girls' schools in West Bengal
High schools and secondary schools in West Bengal
Schools in Hooghly district
Educational institutions established in 1987
1987 establishments in West Bengal